24th CDG Awards
March 9, 2022

Contemporary: 
Coming 2 America

Period: 
Cruella

Sci-Fi/Fantasy: 
Dune
The 24th Costume Designers Guild Awards, honoring the best costume designs in film, television, and media for 2021, was held on March 9, 2022. The nominees were announced on January 26, 2022.

Winners and nominees
The winners are in bold.

Film

Television

Short Form

References

External links 
Official website

Costume Designers Guild Awards
2021 film awards
2021 television awards
2021 in American cinema
2021 in American television
2021 in fashion